Kastein is a surname. Notable people with the surname include:

 Gerrit Kastein (1910–1943), Dutch communist, neurologist, and resistance fighter
 Joseph Kastein (1890–1945), German-born author
 Jenny Kastein (1913–2000), Dutch swimmer